John Emmanuel Cortes, MBE, is an ecologist, zoologist, Justice of the Peace and Gibraltarian MP, member of the Gibraltar Socialist Labour Party. He is married and has two children.

Biography
Cortes founded the Gibraltar Union of Students. In 1976, he became the first General Secretary of the Gibraltar Ornithological & Natural History Society (GONHS), and since 1991, Director of the Gibraltar Botanic Gardens, positions he held until taking government office in 2011.

Between 1983 and 1991, he was also a civil servant, having reached the post of General Manager of the Gibraltar Health Authority.

He was also a Magistrate for 17 years, and was elected President of the Gibraltar Magistrates' Association in 2009.

In December 2011, with his election to the Gibraltar Parliament, Cortes resigned from all his other public duties, and was appointed Minister of Health and Environment by Chief Minister Fabian Picardo.

Academic life 
Cortes graduated in Ecology in London, and received his D.Phil. from Oxford University, in 1983.

References

External links 
Minister for Health and Environment – Government of Gibraltar Information Services
Ministry for Health and Environment – Government of Gibraltar Information Services (with brief profile)

Alumni of Magdalen College, Oxford
British botanists
Government ministers of Gibraltar
Gibraltar Socialist Labour Party politicians
Living people
Members of the Order of the British Empire
20th-century births
Year of birth missing (living people)